Eleftheria Plevritou (born April 23, 1997) is a Greek water polo player currently playing for Olympiacos Water Polo Club and the Greece women's national team. She was part of the Greece women's national water polo team that won the silver medal at the 2018 European Championship in Barcelona.

Career
Eleftheria Plevritou is a high-level Water Polo athlete with plenty of participation with the National team of Greece since 2010. She first played with the Senior Team at an early age of 14 years old and took 3rd place in the FINA World League Super Final 2012.  

As a professional player for Olympiacos, Plevritou has won the LEN Women's Euro League,   in 2015 and 2021, the LEN Super Cup in 2015 and 2021, the Women's LEN Trophy, in 2014 and several Greek Women's Water Polo League . From 2014 till 2021 she has 8 Greek Women’s Water Polo League in a row. 3 Greeks Women’s Cups in 2018, 2020, 2021. From 2014 until today her team is always in the top teams of Europe.

International competitions
 2018 Women's European Water Polo Championship, Barcelona, Spain, silver medal
 2012 FINA Women's Water Polo World League, Changshu, China, bronze medal
 2012 FINA World Women's Youth Water Polo Championships, Perth, Australia, 1st place (best 7 players ) 
 2013 FINA World Women's Junior Water Polo Championships, Volos, Greece, 3rd place
 2013 LEN Women's European Youth Water Polo Championships, Istanbul, Turkey, 1st place (MVP) 
 2014 LEN Women's European Junior Water Polo Championships, Ostia, Italy, 1st place (MVP)
 2016 LEN Women's European Junior Water Polo Championships, The Hague, Netherlands, 3rd place
 2017 FINA World Women's Junior Water Polo Championships, Volos, Greece, 2nd place
  2018 LEN Women’s Europa Cup Final 6, Pontevedra, Spain 1st place
  2018 Mediterranean Games, Tarragona, Spain, 3rd place

References

1997 births
Living people
Greek female water polo players
Olympiacos Women's Water Polo Team players
Water polo players from Thessaloniki
21st-century Greek women